Kevin James Black (born September 25, 1979) is a wrestling coach, the founder and former owner of the Victory School of Wrestling. Kevin is currently head coach for the River Falls High School wrestling team, and a former standout wrestler for the state of Wisconsin.

Kevin has provided significant coaching for women/female wrestlers competing internationally. Kevin was mat side coaching Helen Maroulis to an Olympic Gold Medal at the 2016 Olympics in Rio de Janeiro.

Career

High school 
Kevin won four individual high school state titles at River Falls High School with a 160-0 career record.   During high school, he also won four freestyle state titles and three Greco-Roman titles.  In 1998 he was an ASICS Tiger and an Amateur Wrestling News and Wrestling USA All-American honorable mention.  Black holds RFHS records for most career wins (160), highest career win percentage (100%), Career pins (101), Career takedowns (589), and career team points (1,103.5).

College 
After graduation from River Falls High in 1998, Black wrestled at the University of Wisconsin-Madison (UW). During his Junior season Black was named an All-American after placing 4th at the NCAA tournament.   His senior season was cut short due to injury. He was a team captain for three of his four years at Wisconsin.

Coaching career
Black is currently the head coach at River Falls High School.   He began his coaching career in college, running Black Bros Wrestling Camps with his brother Tony.  They were the Wisconsin Wrestling Federation Co-State Coaches in 2003-05.  Black also spent one season as an assistant high school wrestling coach in Lodi, WI.  Black also spent two years on the coaching staff at the University of Wisconsin. Black has been a World Team coach in 2007 (Baku, Azerbaijan), 2009 (Herning, Denmark) and 2011 (Istanbul, Turkey) and has led on many international tours with USA Wrestling.  He has also been a part of the Olympic Development Program since 2007 and was a club coach with the New York AC, which won the women's team title at the 2009 U.S. National Championships. Black began coaching at River Falls High School in 2013.

Victory School of Wrestling
In 2010 Black created the Victory School of Wrestling.  Its mission  statement notes that: "Victory School of Wrestling aims to build championship wrestlers with championship character, tremendous work ethic, high morality and integrity."
At Victory, Black has been a part of developing over 30 high school state champions, 39 USAW All-Americans and 7 World Team/US National Team members.

Awards and honors
 Black was undefeated in high school wrestling, posting a 160-0 career record.
 In college he was an All-American.
 In 2009 and 2011, Black was named USA Wrestling Women's Coach of the Year.

Personal life
Black is married to Liz (Reusser) Black, a WCCCA Hall of Fame inductee and cross country star at Middleton High School and University of Wisconsin.   They have three children.

References

External links
 Victory School of Wrestling
 River Falls Wrestling

1979 births
Living people
American male sport wrestlers
American wrestling coaches
People from River Falls, Wisconsin
Wisconsin Badgers wrestlers
Wisconsin Badgers wrestling coaches
High school wrestling coaches in the United States